Cinépolis Chile is a Chilean cinema chain. It was founded in 1997 by the Australian Hoyts chain. The chain's theaters were sold to Chilefilms in 2010, becoming the largest movie circuit in the country. In 2015, Hoyts Chile was acquired by the Mexican giant Cinépolis (Latin America's largest movie chain). Also that year the circuit opened the country's first IMAX theater.

External links 
 Cinépolis Chile

References 

Companies of Chile
Cinema and movie theatre chains in Chile